The Age of Adaline is a 2015 American romantic fantasy film directed by Lee Toland Krieger and written by J. Mills Goodloe and Salvador Paskowitz. The film stars Blake Lively in the title role, with Michiel Huisman, Kathy Baker, Amanda Crew, Harrison Ford, and Ellen Burstyn in supporting roles. Narrated by Hugh Ross, the story follows Adaline Bowman, a young woman who stops aging after being brought back to life from death following an accident at the age of 29.

The film was co-produced by Sidney Kimmel Entertainment and Lakeshore Entertainment. In October 2013, Lively was cast as the title character, with Krieger attached to direct. Principal photography took place in Vancouver from March 5 to May 5, 2014.

The Age of Adaline premiered in New York City on April 19, 2015, was cinematically released on April 24 in the United States by Lionsgate. The film received mixed reviews from critics, with many praising the performances of Lively and Ford, and was frequently cited as some of their best work in recent years. It was a modest box-office success, grossing $65.7 million worldwide on a $25 million budget. The film received two nominations at the 42nd Saturn Awards, one for Best Fantasy Film and one for Lively for Best Actress.

Plot

Adaline Bowman purchases fake IDs and then opens a box of film reels that highlight historical events. A voiceover tells the story of Adaline's life. She was the first baby born in San Francisco on New Year's Day of 1908. She married and gave birth to a daughter, only to become a widow when her husband died in an accident during the construction of the Golden Gate Bridge in 1937. Ten months later, Adaline crashed her car into a ravine and died in the freezing lake in Sonoma County, but a lightning strike revived her. From that moment, Adaline stayed physically 29 years old.

Two suspicious FBI agents attempt to abduct her for study, but she escapes and realizes she will have to spend the rest of her life on the run. Ever since, she has periodically changed her identification while her daughter Flemming ages normally.

On New Year's Eve 2014, as "Jennifer", she meets Ellis Jones at a party. Knowing she can never fall in love, she initially refuses his request to see her again but accepts the next day when he shows up at her work.

In a flashback, Adaline pulls up in a cab to where a man is waiting, holding an engagement ring. She tells the cab driver to keep going.

Ellis asks Adaline to his parents' fortieth anniversary party. His father, William, recognizes her instantly and calls her Adaline. She tells him Adaline was her deceased mother. A flashback reveals William was the man with the engagement ring.

William is shaken when he notices a scar on Adaline's hand, revealed in a flashback to be a cut Adaline sustained while she and William were hiking together decades ago and which he had stitched himself. He confronts her. She, upset, says she used to be "normal" and doesn't know what changed her. He, for Ellis's sake, begs her not to run but she says she doesn't know how to stay. She writes Ellis a note and leaves. Finding the letter, Ellis confronts his father who refuses to explain.

Driving home, Adaline recalls all the times she has run. She stops the car and calls her daughter to tell her she is going to stop running. A tow truck plows into her car, pushing it into a ravine. Adaline is ejected from the car and dies from hypothermia. An ambulance crew revives her with a defibrillator and she wakes up in the hospital with Ellis at her bedside. They profess their love for one another, and Adaline tells him of her 107 years of life, always running and afraid of being discovered.

A year later, Ellis and Adaline are leaving for a New Year's Eve party when, in the hallway mirror, she notices her first grey hair. When Ellis asks if she is okay, she responds: "Yes, perfect."

Cast

Blake Lively as Adaline Bowman ("Jennifer")
Michiel Huisman as Ellis Jones
Harrison Ford as William Jones
Ellen Burstyn as Flemming
Kathy Baker as Kathy Jones
Amanda Crew as Kikki Jones

Production
On May 12, 2010, it was announced that The Age of Adaline would be co-financed and co-produced by Lakeshore Entertainment and Sidney Kimmel Entertainment. Salvador Paskowitz and J. Mills Goodloe wrote the script. Sierra / Affinity has the international rights, while producers were Steve Golin, Alix Madigan, Tom Rosenberg and Gary Lucchesi. On July 20, 2010, it was reported that Andy Tennant was set to direct the film. On October 31, 2010, Summit Entertainment bought the US distribution rights to the film, which was set to begin shooting in March 2011 for an early 2012 release.

On February 22, 2011, it was reported that Gabriele Muccino was in talks to direct the film, replacing Tennant, with the film re-titled from The Age of Adaline to simply Adaline. On May 14, 2012, it was announced that Spanish director Isabel Coixet would direct the film instead. On October 16, 2013, Lee Toland Krieger was reported to be the actual director of the film. Producer Dan Cohen had shown him the script at a general meeting in 2009.

Casting
On May 12, 2010, Katherine Heigl was cast as the title character. On November 12, 2010, Angela Lansbury was added to the cast of the film, set to play the daughter of the ageless Adaline. On November 15, Heigl withdrew from Adaline'''s cast, and there were rumors that she had been fired by Lakeshore, which both Lakeshore and Heigl denied. She later announced that her withdrawal was a result of her recent adoption of a daughter. On August 15, 2011, TheWrap reported that Natalie Portman had been offered the lead role. On August 25, Portman told Entertainment Weekly that she had declined the offer.

On October 16, 2013, Blake Lively and Ellen Burstyn were cast in the film to play the lead roles, with Lively starring as the title character. On January 15, 2014, Harrison Ford joined the cast, and the film was set to begin shooting in March of that year. On February 11, 2014, Michiel Huisman joined the cast to star opposite Lively as Adaline's love interest.

Filming
Filming began on March 10, 2014, in Vancouver and continued through May 5. On March 11, 2014, filming at the Hotel Vancouver commenced. Anamorphic lenses and minimal use of steadicams were employed to provide greater authenticity for scenes set in the 1930s, 1940s, and 1950s. The films Gentlemen Prefer Blondes and How to Marry a Millionaire served as inspiration for the period color tone and saturation.

Music
While Rob Simonsen scored the film, Lana Del Rey contributed a song titled "Life Is Beautiful," which is featured in the film's trailer but not included in the soundtrack.

Release
On August 15, 2014, Lionsgate set the film for a January 23, 2015 worldwide release. Later, the date was moved to April 24, 2015. The film was released on DVD on September 8, 2015.

Marketing
The promotional campaign was aimed primarily at fashion-conscious women. Danielle DePalma, executive vice-president of digital marketing at Lionsgate, said, "We were very aware of Blake’s high-fashion profile when we crafted the campaign, and there was so much beautiful imagery from the film." They created vignettes for MTV and VH1 and a fashion segment for E! News showing viewers how to achieve the same looks as Lively. They created a custom "Fashion Journey Through the Decades" initiative, through which a fashion influencer from YouTube or Maker Studios created a unique look inspired by the film. Video ads were also released on Instagram and tutorials on Pinterest. Advance screenings for fashion and lifestyle influencers took place in partnership with Gilt City. The application Periscope was used to spread information about the film.

Reception
Box officeThe Age of Adaline earned $42,629,776 in North America and $23,033,500 in other countries, for a worldwide box office gross of $65.7 million. The film opened with $575,000 during Thursday late-night showings at 2,100 U.S. theaters. It finished the weekend at number three behind Furious 7 and Paul Blart: Mall Cop 2 with $13.4 million from 2,991 locations.

Critical responseThe Age of Adaline has received mixed reviews from critics, although the performances of Blake Lively and Harrison Ford received very positive reviews and were cited as some of their best work in recent years. The site's consensus reads: "The Age of Adaline ruminates on mortality less compellingly than similarly themed films, but is set apart by memorable performances from Blake Lively and Harrison Ford." On Metacritic, the film has a score of 51 out of 100, based on 32 critics, indicating "mixed or average reviews". In CinemaScore polls conducted during the opening weekend, cinema audiences gave The Age of Adaline an average grade of "A−" on an A+ to F scale.

Matt Zoller Seitz of RogerEbert.com gave the film three out of four stars, expressing surprise at the film's increase in quality midway through: "I've never seen a less involving movie become so compelling at the exact moment when you've resigned to write it off as just okay." He also gave high praise to Harrison Ford's dramatic performance, writing that "Ford's voice—always deep, lowered an octave by age and one more by William's longing—is even more powerful [than the devastating look on his face]. This is Ford's best performance since The Fugitive, maybe since Witness''".

Accolades

References

External links

2015 films
2015 fantasy films
2015 romantic drama films
2010s American films
2010s English-language films
2010s fantasy drama films
2010s romantic fantasy films
American fantasy drama films
American romantic drama films
American romantic fantasy films
Films about immortality
Films directed by Lee Toland Krieger
Films produced by Gary Lucchesi
Films produced by Sidney Kimmel
Films produced by Tom Rosenberg
Films scored by Rob Simonsen
Films set in San Francisco
Films shot in Vancouver
Lakeshore Entertainment films
Magic realism films
Sidney Kimmel Entertainment films